A constitutional referendum was held in Haiti on 2 June 1935. The amendment would extend the term of President Sténio Vincent, and was reportedly approved by 100% of voters, with just 297 against.

Results

References

1935 in Haiti
1935 referendums
Initiatives and referendums in Haiti
Constitutional referendums in Haiti
June 1935 events